New York's 37th congressional district was a congressional district for the United States House of Representatives in New York. It was created in 1903 as a result of the 1900 Census. It was eliminated as a result of the redistricting cycle after the 1980 Census. It was last represented by Henry J. Nowak who was redistricted into the 33rd District.

Past components
1973–1983:
Parts of Erie
1971–1973:
All of Genesee, Orleans, Wyoming
Parts of Erie, Livingston, Monroe
1963–1971:
All of Genesee, Livingston, Orleans, Wyoming
Parts of Monroe
1953–1963:
All of Broome, Chemung, Steuben, Tioga
1945–1953:
All of Broome, Chenango, Madison
1913–1945:
All of Chemung, Schuyler, Steuben, Tioga, Tompkins
1903–1913:
All of Allegany, Cattaraugus, Chautauqua

List of members representing the district

Election results
The following chart shows historic election results. Bold type indicates victor. Italic type indicates incumbent.

References
 
 
 Congressional Biographical Directory of the United States 1774–present
 Election Statistics 1920–present Clerk of the House of Representatives

37
Former congressional districts of the United States
1903 establishments in New York (state)
1983 disestablishments in New York (state)
Constituencies established in 1903
Constituencies disestablished in 1983